Lindsey Buckingham is the seventh solo studio album by American guitarist, vocalist, and former Fleetwood Mac member Lindsey Buckingham. The album was released on September 17, 2021. Written, produced, and recorded by Buckingham at his home studio in Los Angeles, the album was released via vinyl, CD, and on digital and streaming services.

The album was announced June 8, 2021, alongside the release of the album's lead single "I Don't Mind". The album's second single, "On the Wrong Side", was released on July 23, 2021. A third single, "Scream", was released on September 1, 2021.

Buckingham launched a US tour to support the album, starting in September 2021. This was his first tour since he underwent open heart surgery in 2019. He was supposed to return to touring in 2020, but the plans were canceled due to the ongoing COVID-19 pandemic.

Background
According to Buckingham, the album was fully complete in 2018, but he decided to temporarily shelf the album and release Solo Anthology: The Best of Lindsey Buckingham that year instead. The studio album, which was tentatively titled "Blue Light", was pushed back to 2019. Buckingham was preparing a tour to promote the album in early 2019, but underwent open heart surgery before the start of the tour. The album was delayed again in 2020 due to the COVID-19 pandemic.

Most of the songs on Lindsey Buckingham began as voice memos on Buckingham's phone containing "seeds of ideas". Buckingham commented that his goal was to create a pop album with "songs that resemble art more than pop". His favorite tracks on the album, "Swan Song" and "Power Down", incorporate a set of electronic drum loops that were combined to create something rhythmically elaborate. "I wanted to do something that felt a little more techno, and the drum loops were just a great starting point and pretty much led to everything else. It was a way of having a little slap across the face just when you thought the album might be a little too pretty."

In November 2021, Jordon Zadorozny and Brad Laner were given songwriting credits for "Swan Song" after the former discovered lyrical similarities with the chorus of the song "Mind's Eye". Buckingham had produced a couple of tracks for them in 2000 at The Village Studio where Tusk was recorded. After the studio session, Laner gave Buckingham a CD with songs he had co-written with Zadorozny, with one of those being "Mind's Eye". Buckingham later recorded a demo of the song, which he rediscovered while compiling material for his eponymous album, but forgot that Zadorozny and Laner had written it.

At the conclusion of Buckingham's North American tour, Buckingham, Zadorozny, and Laner amicably agreed upon legal paperwork that granted the latter two songwriting credits, a percentage of the publishing, and a flat sum of money. Neither Zadorozny nor Laner harbored any resentment over the misunderstanding, with Zadorozny saying that “I'm grateful to Lindsey for rediscovering this piece of music and I love what he did with it.”

Critical reception

At Metacritic, which assigns a weighted average rating out of 100 to reviews from mainstream publications, the album received a score of 79, based on 13 reviews. Greil Marcus praised the album, writing that "everything here sings with delight. There’s pleasure in music-making that gives Buckingham’s confident, all-the-time-in-the-world singing a lift right out of 'Blind Love,' a doo-wop ballad that sounds like something he and his high school friends made up while cruising up and down the San Francisco Peninsula instead of doing homework." Rhys Buchanan wrote in NME that "even the most casual Fleetwood Mac fans won’t have to look hard to uncover the band’s classic hallmarks, which are dotted all over the listen...The album bustles with defiant spirit while leaning heavily on deeply catchy songwriting and production. And with Mick Fleetwood having reconciled with Buckingham back in March, it’s exactly the kind of triumphant return that could give his old band food for thought."

Track listing

Personnel
 Lindsey Buckingham – electric and acoustic guitars, guitar synthesizer, bass guitar, synthesizer bass, keyboards, percussion, drum programming, vocals

Production
 Lindsey Buckingham – performance, mixing, producer, engineering
 Stephen Marcussen – mastering
 Mark Needham – mixing
 Liz Hirsch – design, layout
 John Russo – photography

Charts

References 

2021 albums
Lindsey Buckingham albums
Albums postponed due to the COVID-19 pandemic
Albums recorded in a home studio